Sex of the Witch is a 1973 Italian erotic gothic horror film directed by Angelo Pannaccio and starring Susanna Levi, Jessica Dublin, Sergio Ferrero, Donald O'Brien, and Camille Keaton.

Cast

Production
Shooting on the film began on March 6, 1972 in Sermoneta. Donald O'Brien stated that the budget was so low on Sex of the Witch that he had to pay for his own food and hotel room during production. Actress Camille Keaton also admitted not knowing the film's plot on set, and when she confessed this to another actor, he claimed the same amount of confusion.

Release
Sex of the Witch was released in France before it was released in Italy as Les Anges Pervers on 18 October 1973. It was distributed theatrically in Italy by Regional on 20 March 1974. The film grossed a total of 72,169,000 Italian lire domestically.

References

Sources

External links
 
 Sex of the Witch at Variety Distribution

1973 horror films
1973 films
Gothic horror films
Italian erotic horror films
Films shot in Lazio
1970s Italian films